Labette Health is a 99 bed Level III Trauma Center located in Parsons, Kansas and was founded in 1961. Labette Health is accredited by the American Osteopathic Association's Healthcare Facilities Accreditation Program.

References

External links
Labette Health website

Hospital buildings completed in 1961
Hospitals in Kansas
Buildings and structures in Labette County, Kansas
Trauma centers